Sandro Antonio Porchia (born 14 June 1977 in Olpe, Germany) is an Italian footballer.

He climbed the ladder of the league system from Serie D to experienced Serie B player.

References

External links
http://www.gazzetta.it/speciali/serie_b/2008_nw/giocatori/52724.shtml

1977 births
Living people
People from Olpe, Germany
Sportspeople from Arnsberg (region)
Italian footballers
Association football defenders
German sportspeople of Italian descent
F.C. Crotone players
Rimini F.C. 1912 players
F.C. Grosseto S.S.D. players
Italian people of German descent
Footballers from North Rhine-Westphalia